The 2018–19 Southern Illinois Salukis men's basketball team represented Southern Illinois University Carbondale during the 2018–19 NCAA Division I men's basketball season. The Salukis, led by seventh-year head coach Barry Hinson, played their home games at the SIU Arena in Carbondale, Illinois as members of the Missouri Valley Conference. They finished the season 17–15 overall, 10–8 in MVC play, finishing in a tie for third place. As the No. 3 seed in the MVC tournament, the Salukis were upset by No. 6 seed Northern Iowa in the quarterfinals.

In an emotional news conference following the game, Southern Illinois head coach Barry Hinson, announced he was stepping down as the coach of the Salukis. On March 20, 2019, the school hired former SIU star point guard and Loyola assistant coach Bryan Mullins as head coach.

Previous season
The Salukis finished the 2017–18 season 20–13, 11–7 in MVC play to finish in second place. In the MVC tournament, they defeated Missouri State in the quarterfinals before losing to Illinois State in the semifinals. Despite winning 20 games, the Salukis did not participate in a postseason tournament.

Offseason

Departures

2018 recruiting class

2019 recruiting class

Roster

Schedule and results

|-
!colspan=12 style=| Exhibition

|-
!colspan=12 style=| Non-conference regular season

|-
!colspan=12 style=| Missouri Valley regular season

|-
!colspan=12 style=| Missouri Valley tournament

Source

References

2017-18
2018–19 Missouri Valley Conference men's basketball season
2019 in sports in Illinois
2018 in sports in Illinois